Aiantis was a phyle of ancient Attica with six demes, the deme with the greatest area was Aphidna.

Marathon is located within the boundaries of this place.

It is attested by Plutarch that fifty-two members of the tribe of Aiantis died from wounds sustained in the Battle of Plataea.

The playwright Aeschylus came from deme Eleusis in Aiantis. His family were eupatrids.

References

Tribes of ancient Attica